Jean Marie Augustin Barbillat (27 July 1864 – 1937) was a French sports shooter. He competed in three events at the 1908 Summer Olympics.

References

1864 births
1937 deaths
French male sport shooters
Olympic shooters of France
Shooters at the 1908 Summer Olympics